Zeng Gongliang (曾公亮, Tseng Kung-Liang; Pe̍h-ōe-jī: Chan Kong-liāng) (998–1078) was a Chinese scholar of the Song Dynasty, who helped write the Wujing Zongyao.

998 births
1078 deaths
Song dynasty politicians from Fujian
Chinese military writers
Song dynasty writers
People from Jinjiang, Fujian
Writers from Fujian
Politicians from Quanzhou